Tragic Prelude is a mural painted by Kansan John Steuart Curry for the Kansas State Capitol building in Topeka, Kansas. It is located on the east side of the second floor rotunda. On the north wall it depicts abolitionist Kansan John Brown with a Bible in one hand, on which the Greek letters alpha and omega of Apocalypse 1:8 can be seen. In his other hand he holds a rifle, referred to as a  "Beecher's Bible". He is in front of Union and Confederate soldiers, living and dead, with a tornado and a prairie fire approaching. Emigrants with covered wagons travel from east to west.

The "tragic prelude" is the Bleeding Kansas period of 1854–1860, seen as a prelude to or dress rehearsal for the Civil War, a period of which John Brown was at the center, fighting to prevent Kansas from being made a slave state. The term "tragic prelude" for this period of Kansas history is attributed by Curry to his champion, the newspaper editor William Allen White.

However, the mural has other figures in addition to Brown, as it turns a corner and continues on another wall, making it difficult to photograph in its entirety. The three figures are rarely discussed as part of the work. Chronologically from right to left are the Franciscan missionary Fray Juan de Padilla and the conquistador Coronado, the first Europeans to visit the land that became Kansas, followed by a plainsman, who has just killed a buffalo.

It is by far Curry's most famous work, the only work of his to have a book devoted to it.

History
Emporia Gazette editor William Allen White began the campaign to get Curry to paint murals for his native Kansas rather than Wisconsin (whose university offered him employment he could not find in Kansas). Other newspapers joined in, and the result was the Kansas Murals Commission. Chaired by Governor Walter Huxman, it was charged with choosing a Kansas artist or artists to create murals for the Capitol, as Missouri artist Thomas Hart Benton had done in the Missouri State Capitol.

Benton's very large mural was on the topic of, and titled, A Social History of Missouri. The Commission decided, not without some controversy, that in contrast with the Missouri Capitol, where Benton was one of several artists, Curry would be the sole artist to create murals for the Kansas Capitol, on the theme of Kansas history. No state money was involved; White led a fundraising campaign that easily succeeded in raising the money to hire Curry.

Curry painted Tragic Prelude from 1937 to 1942, using egg tempera and oils. It is 11 feet 4 inches (350 cm) tall, and 31 feet (940 cm) long.

Curry's description

Curry later described the work as follows:

In a newspaper interview of 1939, he explained that "I wanted to paint him as a fanatic, for John Brown was a fanatic. He had the wild zeal of the extremist, the fanatic for his cause—and we had the Civil War, with its untold misery." Later, he wrote in a letter: "I think he is the prototype of a great many Kansans. Someone described a Kansan as one who went about wreaking good on humanity. This might be the kernel of my conception."

Rejection of Tragic Prelude
The Kansas Legislature rejected the mural and refused to hang it in the Capitol as planned. Curry left Kansas in disgust, abandoning the rest of his Capitol project, and did not sign this or the other completed work, Kansas Pastoral, because he considered the project incomplete. It was hung in the Capitol after his death. His planned first-floor rotunda panels never got beyond preliminary sketches. Much to the displeasure of some Kansans, and reflecting the views of agronomists at his employer, the Agricultural College of the University of Wisconsin, one panel blamed poor farming practices for the erosion and dust storms of the 1930s.

Archival material
A study for the mural is in the Spencer Museum.

In popular culture

The image was used as the album cover of Kansas (1974), the debut album of the rock band Kansas.

Poster recreations and T-shirts were made every year for the annual "Border War" between the University of Kansas and the University of Missouri.

Further reading

References

External links
Kansas State Capitol – Online tour – Tragic Prelude, from the Kansas Historical Society
  Classroom project
 
Poster on Curry from Joslyn Art Museum
John Steuart Curry Murals, state capitol, Topeka, 8 Wonders of Kansas Art

Murals in Kansas
1942 paintings
Paintings by John Steuart Curry
Bleeding Kansas
Books in art
Flags in art
War paintings
Cultural depictions of John Brown (abolitionist)
Tornadoes in art
Monuments and memorials to John Brown (abolitionist)